Gurak (also Romanized as Gūrak, Gaverak, and Gaverrak) is a village in Doshman Ziari Rural District, Doshman Ziari District, Mamasani County, Fars Province, Iran. At the 2006 census, its population was 179, in 39 families.

References 

Populated places in Mamasani County